Louis Gray may refer to:

 Louis Gray (footballer), Welsh footballer
 Louis Gray (producer), American film producer, of The Adventures of Champion
 Louis Herbert Gray (1875–1955), American orientalist
 Louis Harold Gray (1905–1965), British radiation physicist after whom the SI unit, the Gray, was named
 Lou Gray, character in Along the Great Divide